2nd Pyatiletka is a rural locality (a village) in Leontyevskoye Rural Settlement of Stupinsky District, Russia. The population was 0 as of 2010.

Streets 
 Leontievskaya

Geography 
2nd Pyatiletka is located 36 km northeast of Stupino (the district's administrative centre) by road. Avdulovo-2 is the nearest rural locality.

References

External links 
 2nd Pyatiletka on komandirovka.ru

Rural localities in Stupinsky District